Mills Extreme Vehicles (MEV) is a kit car design and manufacturing company based in  Gloucestershire, England, founded in 2003.

As of January, 2016 they exclusively manufacture the Exocet, an exoskeletal design which uses donor parts from the Mazda MX5 Mk1 sports car. An enhanced version of the Exocet, the MX150R, can participate in UK race series regulated by the 750 Motor Club and the MSA.

Personal Mobility Vehicles

Tilting trike 
MEV's first model was a tilting trike, a single seat trike intended for commuter use. The whole front end tilted into the corner; a patent for the mechanism was awarded in 2005, however this model has never been offered commercially.

E-trike 
Single seat ultra compact electric commuter trike. Available since June 2008, the E-trike is sold as set of plans (including a component list) rather than a kit: the builder fabricates the chassis.

tR1ke 
Bike powered, RWD, two seater, exoskeletal, reverse trike introduced July 2009. It uses the engine, transmission and rear swing-arm from a Yamaha R1 donor.

Eco-exo 
Compact tandem seat RWD commuter exoskeleton reverse trike using major components from a Suzuki Burgman, meaning it can accept powerplants from 125cc to 650cc. Not currently in production in UK.

Closed Wheel Passenger Vehicles

Trek 4x4 
The Trek 4x4 is a single donor kit based on Range Rover Classic running gear but mounted midships. It was introduced in August 2005 and aimed at the off-road enthusiast, with improved ground clearance, approach, and departure angles, and reduced overall weight compared to donor. As well as being featured in Kit Car (May '06) & Total Kit Car (July '06), it was also featured in Total Off-Road, and sold in the Netherlands in addition to the UK, though production ceased in 2006.

R3 
The R3, introduced in June 2007, shares the same unconventional seating & mechanical layout combination first seen in the McLaren F1, i.e. three seat with central driver position, mid/rear engine, RWD car. It was powered by a 2.5L Ford Duratek V6 engine. No longer in production.

Open Wheel Performance Vehicles

R2 
Electric kit car commissioned as a promotional vehicle by a company to showcase their products as well as challenging pre-conceived notions about electric vehicles, in terms of type and performance. To that end, the R2 (also known as the Electric Sports Car) was an open two-seater with high-performance (4.5 sec 0–60 time was the aim); it made its public debut at The National Kit Car Show at Stoneleigh on 4 May 2008.

Rocket 

The Rocket was introduced in September 2007. It was conceived as a self-build, budget response to the Ariel Atom, which is credited with creating a new genre of sportscar known as 'exoskeleton' or 'exoskeletal' cars. It is a single donor car using Ford Focus Mk.1 components, but converts mechanical layout to mid-rear RWD.

Sonic7 
Launched in February 2008, The Sonic7 was conceived as more civilized alternative to the Rocket. Though still a roadster (though a windscreen, doors & roof are available as optional extras) it does feature an enclosed cockpit. Design and concept wise, it is very similar to the Rocket mechanically, it uses different, simplified, chassis constructed from straight, box section steel instead of the Rocket's curved, tubular sections.

Atomic 
Single seat side-by-side Bike Engined Car (BEC), introduced June 2009. The mechanical layout is intended to give optimal weight distribution (25% at each wheel) with driver on board. It uses the engine from '98–'06 Yamaha R1 which, combined with its low overall weight of 334 kg, gives a power-to-weight ratio in excess of 400 bhp per ton.

Missile 
The Missile was an electric exoskeletal car, powered by a brushless 3 phase 11 kW motor incorporating regenerative braking; it used eighteen 50Ah lead-acid valve-regulated batteries totalling 12kWh, which can be charged overnight on a high frequency charger. Range is approximately 40 miles, top speed 50 mph and overall weight is 600 kg, including 280 kg of batteries. It is not in production.

Exocet 
The MEV Exocet made its public debut in June 2010 at the Newark kit car show.

It is a front-engine, rear-drive, single-donor exoskeleton kit car based on the Mk1/NA Mazda MX-5 and was aimed at the novice builder

The kit has also been found to be compatible with the later Mazda MX-5 Mk2 & Mk2.5/NB.

To this end, aside from using a single donor, the vehicle is designed to make use of as many of the donor's components with little or no modification.

The MX-5 itself has an unusual subframe that allows the body to be removed, leaving the engine, drivetrain and suspension as a rolling assembly which is then transplanted to the Exocet chassis. The Exocet is currently in production with MEV Ltd. in the U.K. and Exomotive in the USA.

It is also made under licence in New Zealand and since August 2014, in Australia.

Being a kit car there are variations in the final outcome: in the USA, where second-hand V8 engines are more affordable, such modifications have been made giving outlandish power/weight ratios; in the UK one builder has modified a Mazda 1.6 Exocet to produce 430 bhp (977 bhp/tonne).

MEV also produce an enhanced version of the Exocet, the MX150R, which currently runs its own class in the  UK race series regulated by the 750 Motor Club and the MSA.

Other Vehicles

Mevster 
Demand was noted for a MEV with weather protection so MEV developed the Mevster, a similar concept to the Exocet but with more bodywork and the option of a roof. Demand was low, however, and only 20 units were sold. The kit was withdrawn from the market in 2015.

Battmobile 
First shown in 2014, Battmobile is a trade mark registered to Mills Extreme Vehicles Ltd. The electric reverse trike has tandem seats and with its lithium yttrium battery and 3 phase motor it is capable of a 100 miles range.

MEV X5 
In August 2011 this new Coupe based on a Mazda MX5 was launched at the Newark kit car show.

X5 Superlight 
Superlight, a follow up in 2012 to the MEVX5, this is the MX5 based kit with a lightweight space frame chassis and a roadster body similar to the Mazda Superlight concept car.

MEVabusa 

Launched at the Stoneleigh kit car show in 2012, fitted with a Suzuki Hayabusa engine, hence the name.

Replicar 
The Replicar, inspired by the 1959 Le Mans 24hr winning Aston Martin DBR1 has a GRP body, triangulated space-frame and uses a Mazda MX5 (Mk1/2/2.5) as the donor. All-up weight is ¾ ton, slightly lighter than the DBR1, so a build with a standard 1.8 MX5 Mk2.5 would produce in excess of 200 bhp/ton. Currently in production with MEV Ltd. in the U.K. and Exomotive in the USA.

Monster 
The Monster, introduced in 2014 with a Chevy V8. 2 seat open sports car, huge power to weight ratio with 400 bhp on tap.

Charger 
2015 saw an electric conversion and re-style of an MBC VW-based kit car. The air cooled engine and fuel tank were replaced by a larger AC induction motor and Lithium battery pack resulting in a top speed of 80 mph on track.

Rocket MkII 
A revamp of the popular Rocket kit was developed in 2016, featuring a Toyota 1.8 engine with an output of 190 bhp.

Exoblade 
A 2017 concept car based on the Honda Fire Blade engine.

References

External links 
 
 Exomotive - US Exocet Manufacturer & Distributor
 MEV Owners Group - forum for current and prospective owners
 Eco-exo

Kit car manufacturers